Wasmes is a village of Wallonia and a district of the municipality of Colfontaine, located in the province of Hainaut, Belgium.

In January 1879 Vincent van Gogh temporarily moved to the village, in the hamlet of Petit Wasmes, to take up a post as missionary.

References

Former municipalities of Hainaut (province)